Krušče is a small settlement east of Begunje pri Cerknici in the Inner Carniola region of Slovenia. It lies within the Municipality of Cerknica.

References

External links

Krušče on Geopedia

Populated places in the Municipality of Cerknica